Australian Autobus was an Australian bus manufacturer based in Slacks Creek, Brisbane.

History
Australian Autobus was founded by Kevin Johnson and Athol McKinnon. It built in excess of 300 bus and coach bodies on both its own chassis as well as those of other manufacturers.

Australian Autobus ceased trading in 2006.

References

External links
Bus Australia gallery

Bus manufacturers of Australia
Australian companies disestablished in 2006
Australian companies established in 1993